Holapogon maximus, the titan cardinalfish, is a species of ray-finned fish in the family Apogonidae, the cardinalfishes. This species is the only known member of the genus Holapogon. It is native to the Arabian coast and the Gulf of Oman, and it has recently been recorded from the coast of India.

References

Apogoninae
Fish described in 1888
Monotypic ray-finned fish genera
Taxa named by Thomas H. Fraser
Taxa named by George Albert Boulenger